Xenodromius is a genus of beetles in the family Carabidae, containing the following species:

 Xenodromius brachinoides Mateu, 1976
 Xenodromius curtulus Mateu, 1976
 Xenodromius flohri Bates, 1891
 Xenodromius microphthalmus Mateu, 1976
 Xenodromius reyesi Mateu, 1976
 Xenodromius testaceus Mateu, 1976

References

Lebiinae